Balangero is a comune (municipality) in the Metropolitan City of Turin in the Italian region Piedmont, located about  northwest of Turin.

Balangero borders the following municipalities: Corio, Coassolo Torinese, Mathi, Lanzo Torinese, and Cafasse.

References

Cities and towns in Piedmont